Baby Blues is a comic strip.

Baby Blues may also refer to:

 Baby Blues (American TV series), an adaptation of the comic strip
 Baby Blues (Singaporean TV series), a Singaporean drama
 Baby Blues (1941 film), an Our Gang short
 Baby Blues (2008 film), a horror film
 Baby Blues (2012 film), a 2012 Polish film
 Postpartum blues, a medical condition
 "Baby Blues", a song by The Cranberries on the album Bury the Hatchet
 "Baby Blues", a song by Richard Marx on his album Paid Vacation

See also 
 Baby blue (disambiguation)